The Navy Grog was a popular rum-based drink served for many years at the Polynesian-themed Don the Beachcomber restaurants; it is still served in many so-called tiki restaurants and bars.  First created by Donn Beach, who almost single-handedly originated the tiki cultural fad of the 1940s and 1950s, it was one of dozens of rum concoctions that he, and later Trader Vic and numerous other imitators, sold in exotic tropical settings. Not quite as potent as the Beachcomber's more famous Zombie, it was, nevertheless, shown on the menu as being limited to two, or sometimes three, to a customer. Reportedly, Phil Spector consumed at least two Trader Vic’s Navy Grogs at the Beverly Hilton restaurant, without eating any food, the night he later killed actress Lana Clarkson.

Etymology and origin
The word "grog" itself can refer to a variety of alcoholic beverages. It originally referred to a drink made with water and rum, which was introduced into the Royal Navy by British Vice Admiral Edward Vernon on August 21, 1740. Vernon himself had been nicknamed "Old Grog" because of a grogram cloak he wore, and the nickname became attached to the drink. Modern versions of the drink are often made with hot or boiling water, and sometimes include lemon juice, lime juice, cinnamon, or sugar to improve the taste. Rum with water, sugar, and nutmeg was known as Bumboo and was more popular with pirates and merchantmen.

Recipe
To make the original Don the Beachcomber Navy Grog, place in a cocktail shaker 3/4 ounce each fresh lime juice, white grapefruit juice, and club soda; 1 ounce each gold Demerara rum, dark Jamaican rum, and white Cuban or Puerto Rican rum; and 1 ounce honey mix (1:1 honey and water). Shake with ice, then strain into a glass with crushed ice (or ice formed into a cone around a straw). There are several variant recipes, however, and most of these use fresh lime juice and grapefruit juice along with the rums.  Some, though, also add passionfruit juice, while others use guava juice or club soda water instead.  Some recipes specify a sweetening agent of honey mixed with unsalted butter, while others use honey mixed with water. Unlike other famous tiki cocktails such as the Zombie or Mai Tai, Navy Grog uses no exotically flavored syrups such as orgeat or falernum.

The Trader Vic’s Navy Grog is significantly different from  Don the Beachcomber’s. Although Trader Vic’s Navy Grog Mix is no longer available for purchase, this recipe seems to duplicate it: Ideally, use a Trader Vic’s large Mai Tai glass (available for purchase on their website) and fill it about a quarter inch from the top with blender-crushed ice (a few larger pieces keep it colder). In a martini shaker, put one ounce each of light rum (recommended: Havana Club 3, Caña Brava, Cruzan), Gold rum (recommended: Appleton, Mount Gay), and 151 demerara rum (recommended: Lemon Hart) or dark rum (recommended: Myers’s), one ounce of freshly squeezed lime juice (or a bit more to taste), 1/2 ounce freshly squeezed (ideally white, but red works too) grapefruit juice, and a teaspoon (or a bit more to taste) of Allspice Dram (St. Elizabeth). Add simple syrup to taste, at least two teaspoons. Stir and pour over the ice. Add a generous sprig of mint, half of a partially squeezed lime, and a rock candy stick (available on Amazon). Enjoy...but no more than two. Best with Crab Rangoon and hot mustard sauce, spare ribs, egg rolls, etc.

Serving
Whatever the exact recipe, traditionally the Don the Beachcomber version always been served very cold in a large, broad-based Old Fashioned glass, into which a frozen snow cone of shaved ice has been placed, so that the customer sips the Grog through a straw that runs down through the cone. The Trader Vic’s version omits the snow cone but places the crushed ice in the Trader Vic’s Mai Tai glass, with a half a partially squeezed lime, a large sprig of mint, and a rock candy stick.

See also
List of cocktails

Notes

References 

Hawaii Tropical Rum Drinks & Cuisine by Don the Beachcomber, by Arnold Bitner and Phoebe Beach, Mutual Publishing, Honolulu, 2001
How to Make a Navy Grog
I’ll Have Some Rum, Hold the Umbrella - New York Times article featuring the Navy Grog

Tiki drinks
Cocktails with rum
Tiki culture
Citrus cocktails
Cocktails with limeade
Cocktails with grapefruit juice